Mountain View Cemetery is a pioneer cemetery in Oregon City, Oregon, United States. It is located above Newell Creek Canyon, with views of Mount Hood to the east.

The cemetery features the Parents of Murdered Children Memorial.

References

External links
 
 
 
 

Cemeteries in Oregon
Oregon City, Oregon